ISO 3166-3 is part of the ISO 3166 standard published by the International Organization for Standardization (ISO), and defines codes for country names which have been deleted from ISO 3166-1 since its first publication in 1974. The official name of the standard is Codes for the representation of names of countries and their subdivisions – Part 3: Code for formerly used names of countries. It was first published in 1999.

Each former country name in ISO 3166-3 is assigned a four-letter alphabetic code. The first two letters are the ISO 3166-1 alpha-2 code of the former country, while the last two letters are allocated according to the following rules:
 If the country changed its name, the new ISO 3166-1 alpha-2 code is used (e.g., Burma changed its name to Myanmar, whose new alpha-2 code is ), or the special code  is used if its alpha-2 code was not changed (e.g., Byelorussian SSR changed its name to Belarus, which has kept the same alpha-2 code).
 If the country merged into an existing country, the ISO 3166-1 alpha-2 code of this country is used (e.g., the German Democratic Republic merged into Germany, whose alpha-2 code is ).

Besides the former country name and its ISO 3166-3 code, each entry in ISO 3166-3 also contains its former ISO 3166-1 codes, its period of validity, and the new country names and ISO 3166-1 codes used after its deletion from ISO 3166-1.

After a country is deleted from ISO 3166-1, its alpha-2 and alpha-3 codes will be transitionally reserved for a transitional period of at least fifty years. After the expiration of the transitional period, these codes are free to be reassigned.

If a country changes its name without any territorial change, its ISO 3166-1 numeric code remains the same. For example, when Burma was renamed Myanmar without territorial change in 1989, its alphabetic codes were changed, but its numeric code  has remained the same.

Currently, a few ccTLDs using deleted alpha-2 codes are still active or being phased out. However, alpha-2 codes which were deleted before the popularization of the Domain Name System in the late 1980s and early 1990s were never used for the Internet's country code top-level domains (ccTLDs). Likewise, ISO 3166-2, the ISO standard for country subdivision codes which was first published in 1998, predated the deletion of many alpha-2 codes.

Current codes
The following is a list of current ISO 3166-3 codes, with the following columns:
 Former country name – English short country name officially used by the ISO 3166 Maintenance Agency (ISO 3166/MA)
 Former codes – ISO 3166-1 alpha-2, alpha-3, and numeric codes
 Period of validity – Years when codes were officially assigned
 ISO 3166-3 code – Four-letter code assigned for former country name
 New country names and codes – Successor countries and their ISO 3166-1 codes

Click on the button in the header to sort by ISO 3166-3 code.

 Notes

Changes
The ISO 3166/MA updates ISO 3166-3 when necessary. The updating of ISO 3166-3 is totally dependent on the updating of ISO 3166-1.

ISO used to announce changes in newsletters which updated the currently valid standard, and releasing new editions which comprise a consolidation of newsletter changes. As of July 2013, changes are published in the online catalogue of ISO only and no newsletters are published anymore. Past newsletters remain available on the ISO website.

See also

International Organization for Standardization
ISO 3166
ISO 3166-1
ISO 3166-2
ISO 3166-3
List of ISO 3166 country codes
Lists of countries and territories
Sovereign state
List of sovereign states
List of states with limited recognition
Dependent territory
United Nations
Member states of the United Nations
United Nations list of non-self-governing territories

References

Sources and external links
 ISO 3166 Maintenance Agency, International Organization for Standardization (ISO)
 Country codes - Online Browsing Platform (OBP)
 Administrative Divisions of Countries ("Statoids"), Statoids.com
 ISO 3166-1 Change History

3
Lists of former countries